The second Kretschmann cabinet was the state government of Baden-Württemberg between 2016 and 2021, sworn in on 12 May 2021 after Winfried Kretschmann was elected as Minister-President of Baden-Württemberg by the members of the Landtag of Baden-Württemberg. It was the 24th Cabinet of Baden-Württemberg.

It was formed after the 2016 Baden-Württemberg state election by Alliance 90/The Greens (GRÜNE) and the Christian Democratic Union (CDU). Excluding the Minister-President, the cabinet comprised twelve ministers. Seven were members of the Greens and five were members of the CDU.

The second Kretschmann cabinet was succeeded by the third Kretschmann cabinet on 12 May 2021.

Formation 

The previous cabinet was a coalition government of the Greens and Social Democratic Party (SPD) led by Minister-President Winfried Kretschmann.

The election took place on 13 March 2016, and resulted in a significant swing toward the Greens, who became the largest party. The SPD and opposition CDU both suffered major losses, and the AfD debuted at 15%. The FDP also recorded gains.

Overall, the incumbent coalition lost its majority. The Greens held exploratory talks with the CDU, SPD, and FDP. The FDP ruled out a traffic light coalition with the Greens and SPD due to policy differences, while the SPD ruled out a coalition with the CDU and FDP. Thus, a coalition between the Greens and CDU was considered the most viable option.

The CDU voted on 30 March to open coalition negoations with the Greens. Talks began on 1 April and concluded on the 29th, with the coalition agreement presented on 1 May. It was approved by the CDU and Greens congresses on 6 and 7 May, and officially signed two days later.

Kretschmann was elected Minister-President by the Landtag on 12 May, winning 82 votes of 142 cast.

Composition 
The composition of the cabinet at the time of its dissolution was as follows:

References 

Cabinets of Baden-Württemberg
State governments of Germany
Cabinets established in 2016
2016 establishments in Germany